The Monte Grande Formation is an Albian geologic formation in Spain. Fossil sauropod tracks have been reported from the formation.

Correlation

See also 
 List of dinosaur-bearing rock formations
 List of stratigraphic units with sauropodomorph tracks
 Sauropod tracks

References

Bibliography 
  

Geologic formations of Spain
Lower Cretaceous Series of Europe
Cretaceous Spain
Albian Stage
Ichnofossiliferous formations